Viola rafinesquei (syn. Viola bicolor), commonly known as the American field pansy or wild pansy, is an annual plant in the violet family found throughout much of North America. There has been some debate as to whether the plant is native there or if it was introduced from the Old World as a variety of Viola kitaibeliana, but it is now generally thought to be native to the North America. It is common in disturbed habitats but is also found in fields and open woods on substrates ranging from sandy soil to clay to limestone.

References

rafinesquei
Flora of North America